The Heinkel HD 23 was a carrier-borne fighter biplane designed in Germany at Heinkel Flugzeugwerke in the 1920s, for export to Japan. Two examples were delivered to Aichi as pattern aircraft in 1927. Aichi added rudimentary flotation capability and built two further examples as the Type H Carrier Fighter, but full-scale production was not started.

Specifications (HD 23a)

References
 Green, W. & Swanborough, G. (1994). The Complete Book of Fighters. London: Salamander Books. 
 

Biplanes
1920s German fighter aircraft
Carrier-based aircraft
HD 23
Single-engined tractor aircraft
Aircraft first flown in 1927